The Brick Testament is a project created by Elbe Spurling in which Bible stories are illustrated using still photographs of dioramas constructed entirely out of Lego bricks.

The project began as a website in October 2001 that featured six stories from the Book of Genesis, and is completely unaffiliated with the Lego company.  There is also a Brick Testament book series.

Throughout stories are retold using passages from the Bible, with chapter and verse cited, the wording being a free adaptation that Spurling says is based on a number of public domain Bible translations. Occasionally, mostly when images are being used to contrast with the underlying scripture, Spurling dramatizes the images with additional text. Such text is displayed in gray instead of the usual black.

Authorial commentary
Spurling's own commentary occasionally appears in illustrations and is displayed in gray text, and also as original titles for the stories themselves.
A Rolling Stone article that is included as a link in the Brick Testament web site suggests that Spurling is an atheist. In 2015 Spurling announced on Facebook that she was an atheist, a transgender woman, and a lesbian, and had legally changed her name to Elbe Spurling but would likely retain her birth name, Brendan Powell Smith, for her books. Her author page at Amazon.com is listed under "Brendan Powell Smith."

Lego techniques

The dioramas seen in The Brick Testament are created from Spurling's personal Lego collection.  The pieces come from hundreds of Lego sets dating from the 1960s to the present.

In the few instances where alterations are made to Lego elements, they are generally simple changes made with a hobby knife or permanent ink marker.  An example alteration is God's hair:  Spurling made God's white hair by carving a white helmet piece (found on Peeron).  The only completely non-Lego part of Spurling's scenes is the background sky.

All of Spurling's images are digital. Spurling photographed early scenes with a Nikon Coolpix 950. She now uses a Nikon Coolpix 4500. After photographing the scenes, she adds speech balloons and sometimes makes alterations using image editing software.

Media

Website
The Brick Testament website began in October 2001.  It originally featured six stories from the Book of Genesis. The site now contains over 400 illustrated stories, from both the Old and New Testaments, and over 4,500 images.  It had an Alexa traffic rank of 53,191 in April 2007. Each story is tagged if it contains nudity, sexual content, violence and/or cursing. ,
the website had had over two million visitors.

Books
Several hardcover Brick Testament books have been published, The Brick Testament: Stories from the Book of Genesis, The Brick Testament: The Story of Christmas, The Brick Testament: The Ten Commandments, and The Brick Bible: A New Spin on the Old Testament. The US retailer Sam's Club withdrew The Brick Bible from sale in November 2011, "due to the complaints of a handful of people that it is vulgar and violent".

The Brick Book of Mormon
In a Facebook post made on April 3, 2015, Spurling announced a new project entitled the Brick Book of Mormon. The stated goal of the project is "to make these teachings better known to the world. It is designed to capture the interest of non-Mormons curious to know what the LDS Church teaches, as well as believing Mormons looking for a fun new way to learn and share the history and teachings of their church. This project is currently in the RESEARCH PHASE in which I have been spending many months immersing myself in the scriptures and teaching manuals of the LDS Church and taking hundreds and hundreds of pages of notes. In the next phase, all these notes will be worked into a manuscript. From there the illustration phase will begin. It is not yet determined whether The Brick Book of Mormon will first be published as a book (like The Brick Chronicle series) or whether it will publish first to the web and then go to print (like The Brick Bible)." The project was officially launched on February 6, 2017.

See also
 Biblia pauperum
The Action Bible

Notes and references

External links
The Brick Testament
Elbe Spurling
Alexa.com statistics

Lego
Cultural depictions of Adam and Eve
Biblical comics